Number 164 (Argentine–British) Squadron was a fighter squadron of the Royal Air Force during the Second World War. It was a donation squadron, paid for by the British community living in Argentina.

Background
No. 164 Squadron RAF was originally founded on 1 June 1918, but never received aircraft and was disbanded on 4 July 1918.

164 squadron was reformed at Peterhead, Aberdeenshire on 6 April 1942 as a fighter squadron initially equipped with Spitfire Mk VAs, and became operational in early May.

In January 1943, the squadron moved to South Wales to train as a ground-attack unit, where it was equipped with Hawker Hurricanes. In June 1943, 164 Squadron finally began operations, with their first raids against enemy ships and German coastal targets. In 1944, the squadron received the Hawker Typhoon Mk Ib, which were faster, more robust fighter-bombers with greater firepower than their ageing Hurricanes.

In the prelude to the invasion of Normandy, Squadron Leader Percy Beake was put in charge of the Squadron in May 1944. The 164th was among the first RAF units to see combat on D-Day.

After providing support for the landing forces from southern England, the squadron moved to France in July 1944. During the Battle of Normandy, 164 Squadron attacked enemy armour, and after the Allied breakout moved forward through northern France and Belgium in support of the 21st Army Group. After the surrender of Germany in 1945, the squadron returned to the United Kingdom and was renumbered No. 63 Squadron RAF on 31 August 1946.

Service

See also
List of Royal Air Force aircraft squadrons

References

Further reading

External links

164 Squadron
Argentina–United Kingdom relations